Azy may refer to:

Places
 Al-'Azy, also transliterated Al-'Azi, Israel
 Azy, Cher, commune in the Cher department in the Centre-Val de Loire region of France
 Azy (fr), a hamlet of the municipality of Florenville, Wallonia
 Azy-le-Vif, commune in the Nièvre department in central France
 Azy-sur-Marne, commune in the department of Aisne in the Hauts-de-France region of northern France
 Saint-Benin-d'Azy, commune in the Nièvre department in central France

Other
 AZY, the ICAO code for Arizona Airways (1993–1996)
 Azy (orangutan), male orangutan

See also
 Azie, a surname